The Foundation of Trujillo is an example of Spanish colonial expansion that took place in the area known today as the Valley of Moche in northern Peru. The exact date of Trujillo's foundation is still in dispute; according to historian Napoleón Cieza Burga it is November 1534.

Pre-Columbian cultures
A variety of native peoples lived in the Valley of Moche before the Spanish colonization. The Moche people were assimilated by the Chimu, who in turn were assimilated by the Inca, who were ultimately conquered by the Spanish. The Spanish conquistadors arrived in the area of what is today the city of Huanchaco, and found it inhabited by the indigenous people who worked as fishermen.

Spanish foundation
Trujillo was one of the first cities in the Americas to be founded by the Spanish conquistadors.  It fell within the Viceroyalty of Peru, and was established among four Chimu settlements, Huanchaco, Huamán, Moche and Mampuesto. This was done to create an alliance against the Incas. On November 23, 1537, King Charles I of Spain gave the town the rank of "city" and the coat of arms that remains the city's symbol. This made Trujillo the first city in Peru to receive a coat of arms from a Spanish monarch.

Versions of Foundation Date
Some of the suggested dates for the founding of Trujillo city are:

November 1534 by the Spanish conquistador, Diego de Almagro, who founded the first Spanish settlement in Moche Valley, naming it Trujillo of New Castile after the home city of Francisco Pizarro Trujillo of Extremadura. This is supported by historian Napoleon Cieza Burga.
December 6, 1534 by Diego de Almagro
March 5, 1535  by Francisco Pizarro, This date is supported by historian Raúl Porras Barrenechea. On this date, the first Cabildo of Trujillo city was installed. Since 2010, it has been celebrated as the Week Anniversary of Trujillo Municipality, in commemoration of that event.

See also

Historic Centre of Trujillo
Chan Chan
Huanchaco
Puerto Chicama
Chimu
Pacasmayo beach
Plaza de Armas of Trujillo
Moche
Víctor Larco Herrera District
Vista Alegre
Buenos Aires
Las Delicias beach
Independence of Trujillo
Wall of Trujillo
Santiago de Huamán
Lake Conache
Marinera Festival
Trujillo Spring Festival
Wetlands of Huanchaco
Association of Breeders and Owners of Paso Horses in La Libertad
Salaverry beach
Puerto Morín
Virú culture
Marcahuamachuco
Wiracochapampa

External links

Map of Trujillo (Wikimapia)
"Huaca de la luna and Huaca del sol"
"Huacas del Sol y de la Luna Archaeological Complex", Official Website
Information on El Brujo Archaeological Complex
Chan Chan World Heritage Site, UNESCO
Chan Chan conservation project
Website about Trujillo, Reviews, Events, Business Directory
Municipality of Trujillo

Multimedia
 
 
 
 Gallery pictures of Trujillo by Panoramio, Includes Geographical information by various authors
Colonial Trujillo photos

References

History of Trujillo, Peru
1534 in the Spanish Empire